Judith Crist (Klein; May 22, 1922 – August 7, 2012) was an American film critic and academic.

She appeared regularly on the Today show from 1964 to 1973 and was among the first full-time female critics for a major American newspaper, in her case, The New York Herald Tribune. She was the founding film critic at New York magazine and became known to most Americans as a critic at the weekly magazine TV Guide and at the morning TV show Today. She appeared in one film, Woody Allen's dramatic-comedy film Stardust Memories (1980), and was the author of various books, including The Private Eye, The Cowboy and the Very Naked Girl; Judith Crist's TV Guide to the Movies; and Take 22: Moviemakers on Moviemaking.

Early life and education
Crist was born Judith Klein in The Bronx, New York City, the daughter of Helen (née Schoenberg), a librarian, and Solomon Klein, a manufacturing jeweler. She attended Morris High School in The Bronx, and received a Bachelor of Arts degree from Hunter College and a Master of Science degree from the Columbia University Graduate School of Journalism.

Career
After graduating from Columbia in 1945, she was employed by The New York Herald Tribune as a reporter, film critic, and arts editor for 22 years, and she also worked as TV Guide'''s resident film critic. After the Tribune ceased publication, she was named the first film critic at New York magazine. Upon her death, New York magazine film critic David Edelstein said, "Judith Crist helped set the stage for New York Magazine as a place for popular and yet essentially serious and wide-ranging film criticism. She was tart, sensible, and irresistibly readable, and she cut a colorful figure on the festival circuit, building bridges between filmmakers and audiences in her famous weekend seminars."

She was an adjunct professor at Columbia's School of Journalism (1958-2008). There, she taught a course called "Personal and Professional Style." Her students included film critics Kenneth Turan, David Denby of The New Yorker and New York Times critics Anna Kisselgoff and Margo Jefferson. In 1963, she was awarded an Alumni Award by the Journalism School Alumni Association.

In April 5, 2008, the school presented her with its Founder's Award on her completion of 50 years as a faculty member. She taught until just before her death. She was a longtime member of the Executive Committee of the Columbia University Graduate School of Journalism Alumni Association and served three terms as President of the Alumni Association during the 1960s.

In 1948, Crist took part in Dr. Fredric Wertham’s attack on comic books and published an article in Collier's magazine quoting Wertham and calling for action against violent, sadistic, and provocative comic books which Crist perceived to be affecting the morality of American youth.

Like Dwight Macdonald, Crist reviewed films for the Today show in the 1960s. She conducted the Judith Crist Film Weekends at Tarrytown House, in Tarrytown, New York, from 1971 to 2006.

She wrote the article "Tribute to a Partnership", a tribute to Rodgers and Hammerstein, in 1965, for a booklet that accompanied RCA Victor's original LP release of the soundtrack album of The Sound of Music. However, the article has not been reprinted for any of the CD releases of the soundtrack.

She cited Charlie Chaplin's The Gold Rush as her "first and to-this-day-most-vivid film experience."

Personal life
Judith was married to William B. Crist from 1947 until his death in 1993. She was the mother of Steven Crist, a thoroughbred handicapper and publisher of the Daily Racing Form''.

Crist died at her home in Manhattan on August 7, 2012, at age 90.

See also

 List of Columbia University people
 List of Hunter College people
 List of people from New York City

References

External links
 
 
 The Judith Crist Tarrytown House Film Festival page at Tarrytown House Estate Official Website
 Judith Crist's faculty profile at Columbia University
 
 Judith Crist press books, 1969-1982, held by the Billy Rose Theatre Division, New York Public Library for the Performing Arts

1922 births
2012 deaths
20th-century American women writers
21st-century American non-fiction writers
21st-century American women writers
American film critics
American film historians
American women historians
American women television personalities
Columbia University Graduate School of Journalism alumni
Columbia University Graduate School of Journalism faculty
Editors of New York City newspapers
Film theorists
Historians from New York (state)
Hunter College alumni
Journalists from New York City
New York Herald Tribune people
TV Guide
Television personalities from New York City
American women film critics
Women newspaper editors
Writers from Manhattan
Writers from the Bronx
American women critics